The Canal of Castile (Canal de Castilla in Spanish) is a canal in the north of Spain. Constructed between the last half of the 18th century and the first half of the 19th century, it runs 207 km through the provinces of Burgos, Palencia and Valladolid, in the Autonomous Community of Castile and León.

It is protected by a heritage listing, having been declared Bien de interés cultural in 1991. Parts of it are still in use, although there are now only limited possibilities for navigation: it irrigates 48 municipalities.

History

The canal was planned by the Marques de la Ensenada during Fernando VI's reign. Its purpose was to boost trade by allowing Tierra de Campos' wheat grain production to be transported from Castile to the northern harbour of Santander and to other markets from there; vice versa, the canal was also meant to facilitate the inflow of products from the Spanish colonies into Castile.

The Spanish War of Independence, budgetary constraints and the difficult passage of the Cantabrian Mountains hampered and eventually reduced the initial plan of a 400 km so the canal never reached the Bay of Biscay as initially planned. Overall, its construction took almost 100 years (from 1753 to 1849) and was eventually halted when railroads were built in northern Spain in the nineteenth century, superseding the project.

The canal was most used during the 1850-1870 period, when up to 400 barges plied the canal towed by beasts of burden. Later on, the canal evolved into the spine of a huge irrigation system due to its relative inefficiency and slowliness vs. railfreight as a means of transport. The locks on the canal were decommissioned in the twentieth century.
 
Similar to an inverted 'Y' in layout, the canal stretches , linking the towns of Alar del Rey (Palencia), considered the beginning of the Northern Branch, Valladolid and Medina de Rioseco, lying at the end of the Southern Branch and Campos Branch respectively.

Ecology
The countryside crossed by the canal is of interest for its birdlife. In the Tierra de Campos two large Special Protection Areas (La Nava-Campos Norte and La Nava-Campos Sur) have been designated. These are notable for birds such as great bustards (Otis tarda), residents of dryland farming areas (sometimes described as "steppes") which are typical of the region.  The canal, on the other hand, provides valuable habitats for wetland birds such as the bittern (Botaurus stellaris).

The canal lends its name to two Sites of Community Importance alongside the watercourse:
 a wooded stretch of the canal near Osorno la Mayor protected as Canal de Castilla (150 ha).
 a number of wetlands (some very small) protected as Lagunas del Canal de Castilla (71 ha).  This multi-site protected area has been designated as a Special Area of Conservation and as a Special Protection Area.

In 2006-10 the European Union's Life Programme funded restoration of wetlands in the province of Palencia with the aim of improving the canal's contribution to biodiversity. 
Birds of interest to the project include:
 the aquatic warbler (Acrocephalus paludicola). This species, Europe's most endangered songbird, uses Spain as a migration route.
 the bittern.
The improvements included facilities for bird-watching: two observatories were positioned close to two of the wetlands with the greatest ornithological interest along the Canal of Castile: the Venta de Valdemudo (Becerril de Campos) and the Valdemorco (Boadilla del Camino) lagoons. These observatories complemented one already existing (in Toja de las Ribas, Ribas de Campos) before the LIFE project.

Municipalities crossed over by Canal

Ordered North to South, East to West.

Northern Branch

Palencia Province

Burgos Province

Palencia Province

Campos Branch

Palencia Province

Valladolid Province

Southern Branch

Palencia Province

Valladolid Province

References

External links
Official website.
Canal de Castilla - Wetland restoration and management: Canal de Castilla Special Protection Area, The LIFE Programme

Bibliography

Several authors 1986, El Canal de Castilla, GREFOL S.A. (Móstoles, Madrid) Copyright Castile and León Community Government. Legal Deposit M-8.751-1986

Water transport in Spain
Birdwatching sites in Spain
Protected areas of Castile and León
Special Protection Areas of Castile and León
Canals in Spain